Botteri's sparrow (Peucaea botterii) is a medium-sized sparrow.

This passerine bird is primarily found in Mexico, with a breeding range that extends into the southeastern tip of the U.S. state of Arizona, and a small non-migratory population in the Rio Grande Valley of southern Texas, which is threatened by loss of habitat.

It was not found in Arizona between the 1890s and the mid-20th century due to excessive grazing of livestock; now it is locally common in its Arizona range due to recovery of vegetation. Juvenile birds apparently need dense vegetation to hide in during fledging; the uncommon native sacaton grass Sporobolus wrightii is preferred, but stands of introduced non-native Lehmann lovegrass (Eragrostis lehmanniana) and Boer lovegrass (E. curvula var. conferta) are also successfully utilized, though at lower population densities.

The name of this species commemorates the ornithologist Matteo Botteri (1808–1877).

References

Further reading

Book
Webb, E. A., and C. E. Bock. 1996. Botteri’s Sparrow (Aimophila botterii). In The Birds of North America, No. 216 (A. Poole and F. Gill, eds.). The Academy of Natural Sciences, Philadelphia, and The American Ornithologists’ Union, Washington, D.C.

Thesis
Jones ZF. Ph.D. (2003). The impacts of an exotic habitat on the population dynamics of a grassland specialist, the Botteri's sparrow (Aimophila botterii), in southeastern Arizona. University of Colorado at Boulder, United States, Colorado.
Kirkpatrick CK. M.S. (1999). Trends in grassland bird abundance following prescribed burning in southern Arizona. The University of Arizona, United States, Arizona.

Articles
Bock CE & Bock JH. (1992). Response of Birds to Wildfire in Native Versus Exotic Arizona Grassland. Southwestern Naturalist. vol 37, no 1. pp. 73–81.
Bock CE & Bock JH. (2002). Numerical response of grassland birds to cattle ranching versus exurban development in southeastern Arizona. Ecological Society of America Annual Meeting Abstracts. vol 87, no 79.
Borror DJ. (1971). Songs of Aimophila Sparrows Occurring in the USA. Wilson Bulletin. vol 83, no 2. pp. 132–151.
Contreras-Balderas AJ. (1988). New Records of Birds from Nuevo León Mexico. Southwestern Naturalist. vol 33, no 2. pp. 251–252.
Conway DK & Benson KLP. (1990). A Range Extension for Nesting Botteri's Sparrow Aimophila-Botterii in Southern Texas USA. Southwestern Naturalist. vol 35, no 3. pp. 348–349.
Deviche P, McGraw K & Greiner EC. (2005). Interspecific differences in hematozoan infection in sonoran desert Aimophila sparrows. Journal of Wildlife Diseases. vol 41, no 3. pp. 532–541.
Eaton MD. (2007). Avian visual perspective on plumage coloration confirms rarity of sexually monochromatic North American passerines. Auk. vol 124, no 1. pp. 155–161.
Fall BA. (1973). Noteworthy Bird Records from South Texas Kenedy County. Southwestern Naturalist. vol 18, no 2. pp. 244–246.
Jones ZF & Bock CE. (2002). Nest success as a misleading indicator of habitat quality in the Botteri's Sparrow. Ecological Society of America Annual Meeting Abstracts. vol 87, no 171.
Kirkpatrick C, DeStefano S, Mannan RW & Lloyd J. (2002). Trends in abundance of grassland birds following a spring prescribed burn in southern Arizona. Southwestern Naturalist. vol 47, no 2. pp. 282–292.
Maurer BA, Webb EA & Bowers RK. (1989). Nest Characteristics and Nestling Development of Cassin's and Botteri's Sparrows in Southeastern Arizona USA. Condor. vol 91, no 3. pp. 736–738.
Ohmart RD. (1968). Breeding of Botteris Sparrow Aimophila-Botterii in Arizona USA. Condor. vol 70, no 3.
Swanson DW. (1985). New Nesting Record for Botteris Sparrow Aimophila-Botterii in South Texas USA. Southwestern Naturalist. vol 30, no 1. pp. 161–161.

Botteri's sparrow
Native birds of the Southwestern United States
Birds of the Rio Grande valleys
Birds of Mexico
Birds of Central America
Botteri's sparrow
Botteri's sparrow